The Autovía A-5 (also called Autovía del Suroeste) is a Spanish autovía which starts in Madrid and ends at the Portugal–Spain border, near Badajoz, where it connects to the Portuguese A6 motorway.

It is one of the six radial autovías stemming from Madrid and forms part of European route E90. It replaced most of the former N-V road.

Sections

Major cities crossed

Madrid
Alcorcón
Móstoles
Navalcarnero
Talavera de la Reina
Trujillo
Mérida
Badajoz

External links
Autovía A-5 in Google Maps

A-5
A-5
A-5
A-5
A-5